Paradise Mall may refer to:
 Paradise Mall (Hong Kong), Chai Wan, Hong Kong
 Paradise Mall, Shivaji Place, West Delhi, India
 , a 1999 German film
 "Paradise Mall", a 1975 episode of Police Woman

See also
 Paradise Center, Sofia, Bulgaria
 Paradise Centre, Surfers Paradise, Queensland, Australia